Kastelle Priory was an Augustinian monastery at Konghelle in the former Norwegian province of Båhuslen (now Kungälv in Bohuslän, Sweden).

History
The monastery existed from the end of the 12th century until its dissolution during the Protestant Reformation in 1529. It was founded by Archbishop  Øystein Erlendsson and completely built by the mid-13th century. The monastery was under the authority of the Archdiocese of Nidaros but also had a close relationship with Æbelholt Abbey  at Tjæreby in Denmark. 

King Frederick I of Denmark acquired the monastery in 1529 and gave it to Jørgen Steenssøn. The ruins of the monastery have been archaeologically investigated. During excavations by Swedish archaeologist Wilhelm Berg (1891–1892), the remains of the monastery were discovered. This and subsequent excavation results suggest that the major construction work was performed by the mid 13th century.

See also
Kungahälla

References

External links
Kastelle augustinerkorherrekloster Norsk Slektshistorisk Forening]
 Klosterkullen i Kungahälla

Other sources
Vigerust, Tore Hermundsson  (1991) Kastelle kloster i Konghelles jordegods ca 1160-1600 (Oslo : T.H. Vigerust) 

Augustinian monasteries in Sweden
Augustinian monasteries in Norway
Monasteries in Bohuslän
Christian monasteries established in the 12th century
1529 disestablishments
Monasteries dissolved under the Norwegian Reformation